Darren Lee Holmes (born April 25, 1966) is an American former professional baseball pitcher and current coach. Holmes pitched in Major League Baseball from 1990 to 2003 and is currently the bullpen coach for the Baltimore Orioles.

Professional career

Early years
Holmes was born and raised in Asheville, North Carolina, and attended T.C. Roberson High School, where he excelled in football, basketball, and baseball. He was selected in the 16th round of the 1984 MLB Draft by the Los Angeles Dodgers and opted to turn professional and forgo his scholarship at UNC.

Los Angeles Dodgers
Holmes went 0–1 in 14 games in 1990, his first action in the Major Leagues. On December 20, he was traded to the Milwaukee Brewers for Bert Heffernan.

Milwaukee Brewers
In his first season with the Brewers, he was 1–4 with an ERA over 4.00, although he picked up his first three saves. He pitched to a 4–4 record the following year, but had a 4.72 ERA. Following the season, he was taken by the Colorado Rockies in the expansion draft.

Colorado Rockies
Holmes first season in Colorado was not similar to his last in Milwaukee. He had a 3–3 record but his ERA rose to 4.05. In the strike-shortened 1994 season, Holmes went 0–3 with an ERA over 6.00. When play resumed in 1995, he had a revival, going 6–1 with an ERA of 3.24 and helping the Rockies reach the playoffs. He threw  innings over three games and allowed six hits and two runs while striking out two. In 1996, he again posted a 5–4 record with a 3.97 ERA. His 1997 season is considered his breakout year. Despite a high 5.34 ERA, he was 9–2 on the season. On October 27, 1997, Holmes was granted free agency.

New York Yankees
Holmes signed with the Yankees on December 22, 1997. In 34 relief appearances with the Yankees, Holmes posted an 0–3 record and a 3.33 ERA. Despite not earning a win in the regular season, and picking up two saves, he appeared on the Yankees postseason roster and earned a World Series ring when the Yankees swept the Padres in 1998.

Arizona Diamondbacks
Holmes was traded to the Diamondbacks on March 3, 1999, for Ben Ford and Izzy Molina. He went 4–3 with a 3.70 ERA over 44 games. On April 28, 2000, he was released after posting an 11.57 ERA.

2000
Holmes signed with the Cardinals on May 4, 2000. He was 0–1 with a 9.72 ERA before being traded to the Orioles on June 28. In five games, he posted a 25.07 ERA. He was released on July 19. On August 11, he was signed by the Diamondbacks again. He had a 6.75 ERA in four games. Overall, he finished 2000 with a 13.03 ERA in 18 games. He was released on October 13.

Atlanta Braves
Holmes did not sign with anyone for the 2001 season. He made a comeback in 2002 with the Braves, where he was 2–2 with a 1.81 ERA over 55 games. He also threw  innings in the 2002 National League Division Series, allowing one hit while striking out five. He was re-signed after the season.

In 2003, he was 1–2 with a 4.29 ERA in 48 games. He retired after the season, citing his desire to spend time with his family. He still resides in Asheville and is an entrepreneur.

Coaching career
Holmes was the Colorado Rockies bullpen coach from 2015 through the 2019 season. In December 2019, Holmes was named the bullpen coach of the Baltimore Orioles.

See also
 List of Major League Baseball players named in the Mitchell Report

References

External links

1966 births
Living people
Major League Baseball pitchers
Major League Baseball bullpen coaches
St. Louis Cardinals players
Arizona Diamondbacks players
Los Angeles Dodgers players
Milwaukee Brewers players
Colorado Rockies players
Colorado Rockies (baseball) coaches
New York Yankees players
Baltimore Orioles players
Baltimore Orioles coaches
Atlanta Braves players
Baseball players from North Carolina
Great Falls Dodgers players
Vero Beach Dodgers players
Albuquerque Dukes players
San Antonio Missions players
Beloit Brewers players
Denver Zephyrs players
Colorado Springs Sky Sox players
Asheville Tourists players
Tampa Yankees players
Arizona League Diamondbacks players
Tucson Sidewinders players
Memphis Redbirds players